is a Japanese fashion designer, disc jockey (DJ), record producer and entrepreneur. He is best known as the creator of the urban clothing line A Bathing Ape (Bape) and currently serves as creative director for Kenzo. Additionally he is a member of the Japanese group Teriyaki Boyz, serving as their official in-house DJ since the group's 2005 debut.

Fashion background
Nigo's venture into fashion started in a small store selling a few Bape T-shirts and camouflage print hoodies, which became very popular among teenagers. In 2002, Nigo released the Bapesta sneaker, which according to BBC presenter Jonathan Ross, later became the "epitome of collectable footwear". The sneaker resembles Nike's Air Force 1 design, but instead of the swoosh on the side, it has Nigo's Bapesta logo, a star with a lightning zap extending out of it. In the cover news of the April issue of the trend magazine WWD for Japan, Bape's boss Nigo (formerly known as Tomoaki Nagao) announced that he is about to leave and he will be leaving with Takahashi UC (Undercover) designer Jun Takahashi. Nowhere, established on April 1, 1993, no longer serves as the designer of Bape. Nigo himself also established his personal new company Nigold on April 4, 2009. In 2003, Nigo partnered with Pharrell Williams to create and launch the streetwear brands Billionaire Boys Club and Ice Cream footwear.

In 2010, he launched his new brand Human Made.

In 2014, Nigo became the creative director for Uniqlo's UT brand.

In 2020, Nigo partnered with Luxury brand Louis Vuitton alongside Virgil Abloh to create a capsule collection.

In September 2021, Kenzo appointed Nigo as its new artistic director.

Musical and entertainment background 
Nigo has been associated with popular rap and hip hop artists such as Kanye West and Pharrell Williams. He is the DJ of the Japanese hip hop group Teriyaki Boyz and is also owner of Bape Sounds record label. He also has an MTV Japan show which he created called Nigoldeneye.

Together with BiS manager Watanabe Junnosuke, Nigo is the producer and manager for the female pop group Billie Idle. His involvement with the group began in 2014, when he directed a music video for BiS' song "Nerve", and after the group disbanded, Nigo and Watanabe offered BiS members First Summer Uika and Hirano Nozomi the chance to join their new project, Billie Idle. The group debuted in 2014 with the album "Idle Gossip", for which Nigo is the executive producer.

On January 28, 2022, Nigo and ASAP Rocky released the song "Arya", serving as the lead single for Nigo's album, I Know Nigo!, released via Victor Victor Worldwide and Republic Records on March 25, 2022. It marks Nigo's first solo album since 2005's Nigo Presents: Return of the Ape Sounds. I Know Nigo! was co-executive produced by Nigo alongside Pharrell Williams. Williams and Nigo had first collaborated nearly two decades earlier, when the Neptunes contributed production to Beef or Chicken. The album's second single, titled "Want It Bad", was released in collaboration with American musician Kid Cudi. The album includes guest appearances from Tyler, the Creator, Clipse, Gunna, Teriyaki Boyz, ASAP Ferg, Pusha T, Lil Uzi Vert, and the late Pop Smoke.

Art collector 
Nigo met artist Kaws in 1996 and became an early supporter of his work. In 2005, he commissioned him a painting and Kaws painted the Kaws Album. The painting was sold in 2019 for $14.8 million at Sotheby's in Hong Kong among other artworks. The total of the sales of his art collection was $28 million.

He also worked with Futura, Stash, Hajime Sorayama, and André Saraiva.

Miscellaneous
Nigo speaks little or no English and uses a translator whenever he does interviews.
Nigo has a cameo appearance in the Takashi Murakami short film Akihabara Majokko Princess shown at the "Pop Life" exhibition at Tate Modern in London.

Discography

Studio albums

Singles

As lead artist

Other charted songs

Awards
2005 Style Award, MTV Asia Awards
2020 Fashion designer of the Year Award, GQ Japan Men of the Year 2020

See also 
Star Trak Entertainment
N*E*R*D

References

External links

 Photoshoot of the interior of Nigo's house from Brutus Casa

Living people
Japanese hip hop DJs
Japanese record producers
Japanese fashion designers
1970 births
People from Maebashi